The Mind Benders is a 1963 British thriller film produced by Michael Relph, directed by Basil Dearden and starring Dirk Bogarde, Mary Ure, John Clements, Michael Bryant and Wendy Craig. Screenwriter James Kennaway turned his screenplay into his 1963 novel of the same name.

American International Pictures released the film in the U.S. as a double feature with Operation Bikini.

Synopsis
Professor Sharpey, working in a university research laboratory, is suspected of passing secrets to the Soviet Union and commits suicide. British intelligence believe that his suicide was the result of shame over his betrayal of his country. However, Sharpey's former colleague Doctor Longman believes that the sensory-deprivation experiments that Sharpey was conducting on himself may have rendered him susceptible to brainwashing. He volunteers to undergo the same tests in order to prove his theory. An intelligence officer and a colleague test the theory by trying to brainwash Longman against his beloved wife.

Cast
 Dirk Bogarde as Doctor Henry Longman
 Mary Ure as Oonagh Longman
 John Clements as Major Hall
 Michael Bryant as Doctor Tate
 Wendy Craig as Annabella
 Harold Goldblatt as Professor Sharpey
 Geoffrey Keen as Calder
 Terry Palmer as Norman 
 Norman Bird as Aubrey
 Terence Alexander as Rowing Coach (uncredited)
 Grace Arnold as Train Passenger (uncredited)
 Timothy Beaton as Paul Longman (uncredited)
 Elizabeth Counsell as Girl Student on Station (uncredited)
 Roger Delgado as Doctor Jean Bonvoulois (uncredited)
 Terence Edmond as 1st Student at Party (uncredited)
 Edward Fox as Stewart (uncredited)
 Robin Hawdon as Student in Oxford (uncredited)
 Georgina Moon as Persephone Longman (uncredited) 
 Edward Palmer as Porter (uncredited) 
 Philip Ray as Father (uncredited)
 Pauline Winter as Mother (uncredited)

Screenplay 
 James Kennaway, published in 1963 as a novel with the title The Mindbenders (Reprinted, Valancourt Books, 2014)

Reception
In a contemporary review for The New York Times, critic Howard Thompson called the film an "experiment that doesn't hold water" and wrote: "Credit the Dearden-Relph unit for a smoothly machined drama, not entirely convincing but at least original ... [T]he film slides downhill toward the conclusion that love conquers all, even science. The finale is a highly circumstantial childbirth. Mr. Bogarde, whose coiled, jittery behavior has no place in a 'top secret' laboratory, also murmurs something about experimental freedom."

In a modern-day review, TV Guide called the film "a strange movie that leaves a deeper impression than one might expect due to the originality of the plot and the tense direction. It is the direct predecessor of Altered States."

References

External links
 
 
 
 

1963 films
1960s thriller drama films
British thriller drama films
British black-and-white films
Films shot at Pinewood Studios
Films directed by Basil Dearden
Films scored by Georges Auric
British spy thriller films
Cold War spy films
1960s spy thriller films
Films set in Oxford
Fiction about mind control
1960s English-language films
1960s British films